The flag of Salt Lake City, representing Salt Lake City, Utah, consists of two horizontal bars of blue and white with a sego lily in the canton. It was adopted in 2020 after a city-wide contest to replace a previous flag.

Historical flags

1963 design

The first adopted city flag was designed in 1963 by J. Rulon Hales, the winner of a contest run by the Deseret News. The first version of the flag was made by art students from Highland High School and officially adopted for use on November 13, 1969. It included seagulls, pioneers, a covered wagon, and the sun rising over the Wasatch Mountains in the middle of a white background. The center was in the general shape of a beehive, which is a symbol of industry and relates to the founding of Salt Lake City and its Mormon heritage.

2006 design
The second design of the flag was approved on October 4, 2006, by the Salt Lake City Council. Rocky Anderson, the mayor of Salt Lake City at the time, had sponsored a contest in 2004 to redesign the flag. Anderson argued that the "old flag was too exclusive and focused entirely on the city's Mormon heritage."

The contest, which received more than 50 entries, did not produce any designs that the city council felt had the "symbolic visuals that could be associated with Salt Lake City". They then formed a subcommittee to work with the mayor's office to create new designs for the flag. The final design was approved with a 4–2 margin.

2020 design

In May 2020, the city government opened a two-month contest to redesign the flag with a $3,000 prize for the winning entry. The city received over 600 design entries, of which eight finalists were selected in July by the Flag Design Review Committee for public review. The winning design, announced in September 2020, was created through the merger of two finalists created by Arianna Meinking and Ella Kennedy-Yoon from West High School. The design features a sego lily, the Utah state flower, in the canton amidst horizontal fields of blue and white. It was sent to the city council for consideration with the endorsement of mayor Erin Mendenhall and adopted on October 6, 2020.

References

Flag
Flags of cities in Utah
Flags introduced in 2006
Flags introduced in 2020
Flags adopted through competition
2006 establishments in Utah
2020 establishments in Utah
Christianity and politics in the United States
Mormonism and politics
Mormonism-related controversies